Eucalyptus chlorophylla, commonly known as green-leaf box, northern glossy-leaved box or glossy-leaved box, is a species of eucalypt that is endemic to northern Australia. It is a tree or mallee, with hard, rough bark, lance-shaped or curved adult leaves, flower buds in groups of seven, creamy white flowers and usually conical fruit.

Description
Flowering occurs 
in November or December and the flowers are creamy white.

Taxonomy and naming
Eucalyptus chlorophylla was first formally described in 1986 by Ian Brooker and Christopher Done from a specimen located by Brooker in 1982 near Kununurra. The description was published in the journal Nuytsia. The specific epithet (chlorophylla) is derived from the Ancient Greek words chloros meaning "green" and phyllon meaning "leaf".

Distribution and habitat
Green-leaf box is found scattered over plains and low rises in the Kimberley region of Western Australia, near Kununurra and Fitzroy Crossing spreading east through the top end of the Northern Territory from a latitude between Mataranka south to about Tennant Creek and then in the Gulf Country of Queensland as far east as the hinterland of the Gulf of Carpentaria. It is found growing in woodlands and shrubby plains in gravelly lateritic to loamy soils or sand.

Conservation status
This eucalypt is classified as "not threatened" by the Western Australian Government Department of Parks and Wildlife and as "least concern" in the Northern Territory and Queensland.

See also
List of Eucalyptus species

References

Eucalypts of Western Australia
Trees of Australia
chlorophylla
Myrtales of Australia
Flora of the Northern Territory
Flora of Queensland
Plants described in 1986
Taxa named by Ian Brooker